Frank Bailey (January 5, 1865 – August 26, 1953) was a Brooklyn-based financier and philanthropist. He was married to Marie Louise Eastman. They maintained a city residence in Brooklyn, and a country residence in Locust Valley (near Lattingtown on Long Island), which they purchased in 1911 and jokingly named 'Munnysunk'. The estate became the  Bailey Arboretum.

Early life and education
Bailey was born in Chatham, New York. His father, Dr. William Cady Bailey, was a medical doctor and amateur naturalist (who had studied botany under Amos Eaton). His mother was a school-teacher and homemaker, 20 years younger than his father, a relative of Elizabeth Cady Stanton, and a graduate of Mt. Holyoke College. His parents' house was a station on the Underground Railroad for escaped slaves.

After going to a local school, then Spencertown Academy, Frank Bailey attended and graduated from Union College in Schenectady in 1885 on a scholarship after Williams College turned him down for lack of finances. He served as the Union College treasurer for 51 years, and the college's Frank Bailey Field is named after him.

Career
His career began as a clerk at the Title Guarantee and Trust Company. By 1891 he became vice president of its Brooklyn office, and later became company president until 1924.

Bailey was active in public service. He was a founder and trustee of the Museum of the City of New York, a trustee of the Brooklyn Institute of Arts and Sciences, and chairman of the famous Brooklyn Botanic Garden. In 1929, the Baileys gave $125,000 ($1.6 million in 2011 dollars) for the construction of The Bailey Fountain in Brooklyn's Park Slope Grand Army Plaza, selected on a design competition.

His autobiography, It Can’t Happen Here Again: The Life Story of a Self-Made Man, was published in 1945 by Alfred A. Knopf (ASIN B0007E41VS).

In honor of his humane philosophy of life and nature, his great granddaughter and great great granddaughter have established an equestrian breeding and showing farm, and named it Muny Sunk Stables, Inc.  (There is only one "Munnysunk", says his great granddaughter, Christine Vanneck).

References 

1865 births
1953 deaths
American financiers
Philanthropists from New York (state)
People from Brooklyn
People from Locust Valley, New York